The All-Ireland Senior Hurling Championship 1946 was the 60th series of the All-Ireland Senior Hurling Championship, Ireland's premier hurling knock-out competition.  Cork won the championship, beating Kilkeny 7-5 to 3-8 in the final at Croke Park, Dublin.

Format

The All-Ireland Senior Hurling Championship was run on a provincial basis as usual.  All games were played on a knockout basis whereby once a team lost they were eliminated from the championship.  The format for the All-Ireland series of games ran as follows: 
 The winners of the Munster Championship advanced directly to one of the All-Ireland semi-finals.  
 The winners of the Leinster Championship advanced directly to the second All-Ireland semi-final.  
 Antrim, the representatives from the Ulster Championship, were drawn to play the Leinster champions in the All-Ireland semi-final.
 Galway, a team who faced no competition in the Connacht Championship, automatically advanced to the All-Ireland semi-final where they were drawn to play the Munster champions.

Results

Leinster Senior Hurling Championship

Munster Senior Hurling Championship

Ulster Senior Hurling Championship

All-Ireland Senior Hurling Championship
BracketSemifinals

All Ireland final

Sources

 Corry, Eoghan, The GAA Book of Lists (Hodder Headline Ireland, 2005).
 Donegan, Des, The Complete Handbook of Gaelic Games (DBA Publications Limited, 2005).

See also

1946
All-Ireland Senior Hurling Championship